The seventh edition of the Prudential RideLondon Classique was a UCI Women's WorldTour race on the Saturday evening on a 3.4 km circuit in central London, beginning and finishing on The Mall. The women's elite race, previously known as the Grand Prix pro race, was given UCI World Tour Status in 2016 and has the highest ever value prize money for a women's one-day race.

It was won by Lorena Wiebes after Kirsten Wild, who passed the finish first, was disqualified for causing a crash in the sprint.

Teams
Sixteen teams professional teams each with a maximum of six riders, will start the race:

Results

See also
 2019 in women's road cycling

References 

R
R
R
RideLondon